The Vesper George School of Art was a school in Boston, Massachusetts, United States, founded in 1924 and closed in 1983.

History 
The campus had been located at 44 Saint Botolph Street in Boston, Massachusetts.

For many years the school contributed to the Boston art community, training many talented artists, many of whom are still active in both commercial art and fine arts. In addition to training artists, it served to allow many artists to maintain a living as instructors while they were building their careers.

Alumni
The school's alumni include:
Bob Bolling, writer and illustrator for Archie Comics. Well-known for his work on Little Archie.
Al Capp, cartoonist, comic-book artist, he only attended briefly.
Bill Everett, comic-book artist, creator of the Sub-Mariner
Vernon Grant, comic-book writer-artist, The Love Rangers
, American painter and faculty member at Vesper George
Henry E McDaniel, watercolor artist
Paul McCobb, furniture designer
Robert McCloskey, children's book author and illustrator, Make Way for Ducklings
Francis Sumner Merritt, painter, printmaker.
Jan Miner, actress, "Madge" in Palmolive TV commercials
, New England painter
, New England painter.
Gale Fulton Ross, American visual artist
John Terelak, Impressionist painter

References

External links
Vesper George Alumni website
Vesper George School of Art catalog..WebCitation archive.

Defunct private universities and colleges in Massachusetts
Art schools in Massachusetts
Culture of Boston
Education in Boston
History of Boston
Educational institutions disestablished in 1983
Defunct art schools
1924 establishments in Massachusetts